Anna Cathcart (born June 16, 2003) is a Canadian actress. She became known for starring in season two of Odd Squad (2016–2019) as Agent Olympia. Cathcart also gained wide recognition for portraying Kitty Covey in Netflix's To All the Boys I've Loved Before film series (2018–2021). She is also known for portraying Dizzy Tremaine in Disney Channel's Descendants 2 (2017) and Descendants 3 (2019) and Zoe Valentine in the Brat web series of the same name (2019) and Spring Breakaway (2019).

Prior to starring in Odd Squad, Cathcart acted in commercials such as Crayola and Campbell's Soup commercials. She has starred as Agent Olympia in multiple spin-offs of Odd Squad including the series' film spin-off Odd Squad: The Movie (2016) which had a one-day theatrical release, OddTube (2016–2017) and Odd Squad: World Turned Odd (2018). She was nominated for the Canadian Screen Award for Best Performance in a Children's or Youth Program or Series twice for her work in Odd Squad, the latter of which she won at the 7th Canadian Screen Awards. Additionally, Cathcart appeared in the Disney Channel Original Movie Spin and animated special Descendants: The Royal Wedding, and is set to appear in To All the Boys I've Loved Before spin-off series XO, Kitty.

Early life and education
Anna Cathcart was born on June 16, 2003, in Vancouver where she was raised. She has a sister who is five years older than she is. In 2020, Cathcart attended a public high school. Cathcart described her school experience as being "like having two full-time jobs at once". On the set of Odd Squad, Cathcart and her castmates were tutored in two-hour blocks. She graduated high school in 2021.

Career

Early work and Odd Squad
Cathcart stated her sister began acting before she did and, at the age of six or seven, gained a talent agent and performed in a few commercials. At the age of eight, she appeared in a Crayola and Campbell's Soup commercial. Cathcart stated that she has "never really been to acting classes", saying that she is inspired by performances on Disney Channel and Netflix.

At the age of 12, following a hiatus, Cathcart was scouted and asked to audition for the TVOKids and PBS Kids series, Odd Squad. Cathcart and fellow actor Isaac Kragten were cast as Agents Olympia and Otis respectively. They filmed the series for seven months in Toronto. The first episode of season 2, "First Day", aired on June 20, 2016, on PBS Kids and June 21, 2016, on TVOKids.

In the same year, Cathcart reprised her role for the film spin-off, Odd Squad: The Movie, marking her first theatrical appearance. Cathcart won a Joey Award for her work as well as being co-nominated for another Joey Award along with her castmates. In November 2016, PBS ordered 20 one to three minute episodes of an Odd Squad spin-off titled OddTube. In the series, Cathcart reprised her role as Agent Olympia, the character who hosted the show.

2017–present: Film breakout and other works
In 2017, Cathcart appeared in the sequel to the Disney Channel Original Movie Descendants, Descendants 2, in which she portrayed Dizzy Tremaine, daughter of Drizella Tremaine. The film premiered on July 21, 2017, and was viewed by 8.92 million viewers across six networks on the night of its premiere.

In 2017, at the age of 14, Cathcart joined the cast of the film adaption of Jenny Han's bestselling book To All the Boys I've Loved Before, in which she was to portray 11-year-old Kitty Covey, the younger sister of protagonist Lara Jean. In her audition, Cathcart sat cross-legged which the film crew felt made her "perfect for Kitty". The film was released in 2018 on Netflix and quickly became one of the most viewed Netflix original films. The film received generally favourable reviews and critics praised the actors. Molly Freeman of Screen Rant called Cathcart a "hilarious standout" while Charlie Salek of Joker Mag called the supporting performances "crucial".

In November 2018, Cathcart was cast Brat web-based series Zoe Valentine in which she was to portray the eponymous character. Cathcart had not auditioned but instead was contacted about the role. The first episode, which premiered on January 17, 2019, received 4.9 million views on YouTube as of November 2020. Cathcart described filming as being "crazy", saying "[it was] such a blur but so much fun". Cathcart starred as Zoe Valentine again in Brat film Spring Breakaway which was released on March 15, 2019, on YouTube. Zoe Valentine was later renewed for a second season. Cathcart reprised her role as Dizzy Tremaine in the third instalment of the Descendants franchise, Descendants 3 in 2019.

She reprised her role as Kitty Covey in 2020 in To All the Boys: P.S. I Still Love You which had been filmed from March to May 2019, the film being primarily filmed in Vancouver. Released in February 2020, the film received generally mixed reviews. Cathcart received praise for her performance. The Post said that Cathcart was one of the only members of the returning cast to bring the "same type of energy as [she] did in the first film." She was nominated for the Cogeco Fund Audience Choice Award which allowed audiences to vote for their favourite Canadian working in film, television, or digital media. In mid-2020, because of the restrictions placed due to the COVID-19 pandemic, Cathcart hosted a virtual series called Letters To which allowed fans to connect with their favourite authors. Developed by Picturestart and released on Facebook Watch, Glitter Magazine wrote that the series would have "all literary fans buzzing".

Cathcart reprised her role in the third film of the To All the Boys I've Loved Before film series titled To All the Boys: Always and Forever, Lara Jean, which was filmed majorly in Vancouver, New York and Seoul from July to September 2019.

She starred as Molly in Disney Channel Original Movie Spin premiered in 2021. Principal photography for Spin began in early October 2020 and wrapped in late November. Cathcart's performance was commended by Amy Amatangelo of Paste, who called her the "generation's secret weapon" and stated that projects including her were certain to be of high quality. She also voiced Dizzy in animated special Descendants: The Royal Wedding, which aired after Spin.

Upcoming projects
In March 2021, she was announced to be reprising her role as Kitty Covey in a To All the Boys spin-off series, later revealed to be called XO, Kitty.

Personal life
Cathcart supports being authentic and supports Asian representation in Hollywood: "It's so important for everyone to see someone onscreen that looks like them, no matter what they look like, who they are, or what their race is [...] No matter who you are, if you really want to follow your dreams you can, and it's not just what you look like or what your background is — anyone has the opportunity to make their dreams come true." She describes herself as an introvert. Cathcart has myopia and wears glasses. She identifies herself as "half Chinese, half Irish". Cathcart strongly supports the LGBT+ community, and admires Zendaya and Michelle Obama.

Filmography

Films

Television

Web

Awards and nominations

References

External links

2003 births
Living people
21st-century Canadian actresses
Actresses from Vancouver
Canadian actresses of Chinese descent
Canadian child actresses
Canadian film actresses
Canadian Screen Award winners
Canadian television actresses
Canadian web series actresses
Canadian people of Irish descent